Dictyota spiralis is a species of brown alga found in the temperate eastern Atlantic Ocean and the Mediterranean Sea.

Description
The thallus of Dictyota spiralis is a yellowish-brown colour, sometimes with a greenish iridescent tip. The clump is anchored to the seabed by stolons.

References

Dictyotaceae